Birralee International School Trondheim is a certified Cambridge International School. It was founded in 1973 and is one of the oldest international schools in Norway. The Australian founder gave the school the name 'Birralee' meaning a 'safe place for children'. While a private school, the school is non-profit and co-educational.

About

The school consists of a Kindergarten, a Primary School and a Middle School, and accepts children from 3 to 16 years of age. Birralee International School Trondheim is home to 320 students, 40 teachers and 15 assistants, and is the biggest international school in Trondheim.

Since 1977, the school is located at Kalvskinnet in the heart of Trondheim, close to the famous medieval Nidaros Cathedral. The school is easily accessible by public transport and bicycle. Students who live more than four kilometres away are offered a free bus card.

English is the language of instruction in all subjects at Birralee International School Trondheim. In addition, the children have four to five Norwegian lessons per week. The school offers a diverse after school programme.

Close ties to NTNU 
The school has close ties to NTNU, Norway's biggest university. Many of the school's students have family members who work at the university. The school also offers student teacher placements to student teachers at NTNU's Teacher Training Programme. Birralee International School Trondheim is also a full research partner in NTNU's MOST project.

Awards 

In 1991, the school's founding head Margot Tønseth was awarded the Albert Einstein Academy Foundation Alfred Nobel Medal by the Albert Einstein Foundation.

In 2008 the Year 9 students scored highest in the country on their national tests, according to Norwegian newspaper VG.

In 2009 the entire middle school, Years 9-11, scored the highest in the English national tests for their respective peer groups, according to VG.

See also

 List of international schools

External links
 School website
 Trondheim City website
 Margot L Tønseth
 ECIS: European Council of International Schools

International schools in Norway
Secondary schools in Norway
Primary schools in Norway
Educational institutions established in 1973
1973 establishments in Norway